Miss Universe United Kingdom 2006 , the 2nd Miss Universe United Kingdom pageant, was held at Lorenz Auditorium, London, United Kingdom on 9 March 2006. That year only 30 candidates competed for the national crown. Brooke Elizabeth Johnston of National Capital crowned her successor Julie Doherty of England at the end of the event. Doherty represented the United Kingdom at Miss Universe 2006. The runner up represented the country in different International pageants. 

The pageant starts with the dress of introduction. Then each delegate represented their nation in costume. After they put their dress of introduction back on so they can pick their top 15. After that was the evening gown competition. Judges then selected the top 10 followed by the swimsuit round. Then judges pick their top 5 and asked them a question. Finally they crowned Miss Universe United Kingdom.

Final results

Special Awards

Contestants

External links
 http://www.missuniversegb.co.uk

2006
2006 beauty pageants
2006 in the United Kingdom